The Military Intelligence Corps is the intelligence branch of the United States Army. The primary mission of military intelligence in the United States Army is to provide timely, relevant, accurate, and synchronized intelligence and electronic warfare support to tactical, operational and strategic-level commanders. The Army's intelligence components produce intelligence both for Army use and for sharing across the national intelligence community.

History
Intelligence personnel were a part of the Continental Army since its initial founding in 1776. 

In 1776, General George Washington commissioned the first intelligence unit. Knowlton's Rangers, named after its leader Colonel Thomas Knowlton, became the first organized elite force, a predecessor to modern special operations forces units such as the Army Rangers, Delta Force, and others. The "1776" on the United States Army Intelligence Service seal refers to the formation of Knowlton's Rangers.

In January 1863, Major General Joseph Hooker established the Bureau of Military Information for the Union Army during the Civil War, headed by George H. Sharpe. Allan Pinkerton and Lafayette C. Baker handled similar operations for their respective regional commanders. All of those operations were shut down at the end of the Civil War in 1865.

In 1885, the Army established the Military Intelligence Division. In 1903, it was placed under the new general staff in an elevated position.

In March 1942, the Military Intelligence Division was reorganized as the Military Intelligence Service. Originally consisting of just 26 people, 16 of them officers, it was quickly expanded to include 342 officers and 1,000 enlisted personnel and civilians. It was tasked with collecting, analyzing, and disseminating intelligence. Initially it included:
 an Administrative Group
 an Intelligence Group
 a Counter-intelligence Group
 an Operations Group
 a Language School

In May 1942, Alfred McCormack established the Special Branch of the Military Intelligence Service, which specialized in communications intelligence.

On 1 January 1942, the U.S. Army Corps of Intelligence Police, founded in World War I, was re-designated as the U.S. Army Counter Intelligence Corps. In 1945, the Special Branch became the Army Security Agency.

At its peak in early 1946, the MIS Language School had 160 instructors and 3,000 students studying in more than 125 classrooms, graduating more than 6,000 students by the end of the war. What began as an experimental military intelligence language-training program launched on a budget of $2,000 eventually became the forerunner of today's Defense Language Institute for the tens of thousands of linguists who serve American interests throughout the world.

The school moved to the Presidio of Monterey in 1946. Renamed the Army Language School, it expanded rapidly in 1947–48 during the Cold War. Instructors, including native speakers of more than thirty languages and dialects, were recruited from all over the world. Russian became the largest language program, followed by Chinese, Korean, and German.

On 1 September 1954, the Assistant Chief of Staff for Intelligence (ACSI) officially redesignated the CIC Center, Fort Holabird, Maryland, as the United States Army Intelligence Center, and the Chief of the Counter Intelligence Corps became its Commanding General. The following year, the Intelligence Center expanded further with the addition of the Photo Interpretation Center. Additionally, combat intelligence training (including order of battle techniques, photo interpretation, prisoner of war interrogation, and censorship) was transferred from the Army General School at Fort Riley, Kansas to Fort Holabird, giving the Commanding General the additional title of Commandant, U.S. Army Intelligence School. This arrangement centralized nearly all intelligence training at the U.S. Army Intelligence Center and School, Fort Holabird. 

The Intelligence Center and School remained at Fort Holabird until overcrowding during the Vietnam War forced its relocation to Fort Huachuca, Arizona. Fort Huachuca became the "Home of Military Intelligence" on 23 March 1971, and the last class graduated from Fort Holabird on 2 September 1971, almost 17 years to the day after the Army Intelligence Center was established there. USAINTCS Established at Fort. Holabird, MD

On 1 July 1962, the Army Intelligence and Security Branch was established as a basic Army branch to meet the increased need for national and tactical intelligence. The redesignated branch came with the creation of a new dagger and sun branch insignia, replacing the sphinx insignia that had been in place since 1923.

A number of intelligence and security organizations were combined in July 1967 to form the military intelligence branch. In 1977, they recombined with the Army Intelligence Agency and Army Security Agency to become the U.S. Army Intelligence and Security Command.

On 1 July 1987, the Military Intelligence Corps was activated as a regiment under the U.S. Army Regimental System. All United States Army Military Intelligence personnel are members of the Military Intelligence Corps.

Structure
Approximately 28,000 military personnel and 3,800 civilian personnel are assigned to intelligence duties, comprising the Military Intelligence Corps. Some of the key components include:

Major military intelligence units

Museum
The United States Army Intelligence Museum is located at Fort Huachuca, Arizona. It features the history of American military intelligence from the Revolutionary War to present. In the Army Military Intelligence Museum there is a painting of "The MI Blue Rose". The back of this painting indicates Sgt. Ralph R Abel, Jr. created it. The painting was photographed and distributed worldwide. Sgt. Abel also painted a replica of the corps flag.

Military Intelligence Hall of Fame

List of Deputy Chiefs of Staff for Intelligence, G-2

The office was previously known as the Assistant Chief of Staff for Intelligence. Known prior office holders include Major General Clayton Lawrence Bissell during World War II, and Major General Garrison B. Coverdale during Vietnam.

See also
 Combat Support
 Company Level Intelligence Cell
 G-2 (intelligence)
 Military Intelligence Corps careers
 Military Intelligence Corps Band
 Office of Naval Intelligence
 Sixteenth Air Force
United States Army Counterintelligence

References

Further reading
 
 Ruiz, Victor H. (2010). A Knowledge Taxonomy for Army Intelligence Training: An Assessment of the Military Intelligence Basic Officer Leaders Course Using Lundvall's Knowledge Taxonomy. Applied Research Projects. Texas State University Paper 331.

External links 
University of Military Intelligence

Military Intelligence
Nationstate regiments/corps of military intelligence
Army Military Intelligence
Military in Virginia